Mayors Square is a  public square and park in Troutdale, Oregon, United States. The park has a statue depicting former mayor Clara Latourell Larsson, and has been the site of the city's holiday tree and lighting ceremony.

References

External links

 
 Mayors Square at Troutdale Historical Society

Parks in Multnomah County, Oregon
Troutdale, Oregon